SourceHOV LLC is an American technology-enabled business services company headquartered in Dallas, Texas. It provides enterprise information management and transaction processing services in the BPO industry. In February 2017, Novitex Enterprise Solutions, SourceHOV and Quinpario Acquisition Corp. 2 announced that they will merge to create Exela Technologies, a solutions provider for financial technology and business services.

History
In 2007, HandsOn Global Management LLC (HGM) acquired Lason, a provider of document management outsourcing services. This acquisition led to the creation of HOV Services (HOVS), a company providing transaction processing services to corporations. Subsequently, SourceHOV was formed as the merger in May 2011 of HOV Services, and SourceCORP, a business process outsourcing company. These companies were respectively owned by Apollo Global Management LLC until 2013, CVCI (The Rohatyn Group) until 2014 and HGM and affiliates that remained the majority shareholder. Following this merger, HGM and Apollo created a new corporation called SCH Services, Inc in Delaware. As a result, SCH renamed and became SourceHOV Holdings, Inc., and SourceCorp, SourceHOV LLC.
In December 2013, several notable companies expressed interest in acquiring SourceHOV.
 
In 2014, SourceHOV acquired BancTec Inc., a provider of transaction processing solutions to
commercial banks, governments, insurance companies and large organizations. This acquisition enabled SourceHOV to expand its operations and services into international banking and payments.

In 2016, SourceHOV further transformed into a solution provider for larger industries and incorporated key technologies with the acquisition of TransCentra, Inc., a provider of integrated billing, remittance processing, imaging software and consulting services. The addition of TransCentra improved SourceHOV's position in banking and payment.

In February 2017, SourceHOV, LLC, Novitex Holdings, Inc and Quinpario Acquisition Corp. 2, a Special-purpose acquisition company, agreed to merge and create Exela Technologies a large provider of financial technology and business services to blue chip clients. This transaction, valued at $2.8 billion, is expected to close during the second quarter of 2017.

Overview 
SourceHOV specializes in transactions for international industries including financial services, health care, public sector organizations, insurance, and legal organizations. SourceHOV offers workflow management system and business process outsourcing (BPO) solutions that enable companies to automate complex, data-intensive transactions. The company's business transaction management services include accounts management, financial, healthcare, insurance and risk management services.

Mergers and acquisitions

References

Software companies based in Texas
Multinational companies
Companies based in Dallas
Software companies established in 2011
Defunct software companies of the United States